Samuel Geoffrey Blakely (born 16 June 1993) is a New Zealand cricketer. He has played five List A matches for Otago since 2013. He was the third member of his family to play for the province, after his father, Geoff Blakely, and sister Caitlin Blakely.

See also
 List of Otago representative cricketers

References

External links
 

1993 births
Living people
New Zealand cricketers
Otago cricketers
Cricketers from Dunedin